Thrasyvoulos Football Club is a Greek football club based in Fyli, Attica, currently in the A EPSDA. It was founded in 1938 and named after Thrasybulus, an ancient Athenial General who used Fyli as his base to liberate Attica from Sparta. They gained promotion to the Greek Super League for 2008–09. However, their inexperience caused relegation in their first season in Greek Super League.

References

External links
 Official Website

 
Football clubs in Attica
1938 establishments in Greece
Fyli